Saroj Gupta FRCR (5 December 1929 – 21 May 2010) was an Indian oncologist and the founder of the Cancer Centre Welfare Home & Research Institute in West Bengal. He received India's fourth-highest civilian award, the Padma Shri, in 1987 and also became Sheriff of Kolkata in 1989.

Early life and education
Gupta attained a Bachelor of Medicine, Bachelor of Surgery (MBBS) from Calcutta University in 1955. In 1965, he went to England and completed a fellowship (FRCR) at the Royal College of Physicians and Surgeons, England.

Work
After attaining his MBBS Gupta joined the Chittaranjan National Cancer Institute as a Consultant Radiotherapist in 1956.

While working at the Chittaranjan National Cancer Institute, he witnessed how cancer patients from remote areas were often refused admittance due to a lack of available beds. When the patients were eventually admitted, they were often already in advanced stages of cancer. Dr. Gupta was determined to provide beds and treatment for them as soon as possible.

Gupta wanted to create a place for cancer patients and their families where they could be at peace, surrounded by nature, and supported by modern treatment. He had a clear vision about setting up a modernized hospital, even though at that time there were very few private facilities available in the city of Kolkata.

In the early 1970s, with the help of a team of doctors and social workers, Gupta started to build a cancer hospital on 16-acre territory that had been donated to him. In 1973, his dream of a creating a home for patients suffering from cancer was fulfilled. Originally the hospital contained 25 beds, but after three decades the number of beds had increased to 254 and separate facilities for pediatric cancer had been built. He scripted a drama to raise funds for Kolkata's first modernized cancer hospital at a nominal cost, playing the role of a cancer patient. According to Subir Ganguly, senior oncologist, "his contribution to oncology remains unmatched."

In 1980, after his voluntary retirement from Chittaranjan National Cancer Institute, he engaged himself fully in Thakurpukur hospital.

Awards and recognitions
Gupta received the Padma Shri award in 1987. In 1989 he was given an honour to become the Sheriff of Kolkata.

See also 
List of Padma Shri award recipients (1980–1989)
Sheriff of Kolkata
Saroj Gupta Cancer Centre and Research Institute

References

 Medical doctors from Kolkata
1929 births
2010 deaths
 Sheriffs of Kolkata
 Recipients of the Padma Shri in medicine